The 2019 Cambridge City Council election took place on 2 May 2019 to elect members of Cambridge City Council in England. This was on the same day as other nationwide local elections.

Results summary

Results by Ward

Abbey

Arbury

Castle

Cherry Hinton

Coleridge

East Chesterton

King's Hedges

Market

Newnham

Petersfield

Queen Edith's

Romsey

Trumpington

West Chesterton

References

2019 English local elections
May 2019 events in the United Kingdom
2019
2010s in Cambridge